Oxyderces is a genus of broad-nosed weevils in the family Curculionidae distributed in South America. It can be recognized by the presence of dense setae on the apex of the rostrum and postocular setae.

Taxonomy 
The genus was named for the first time by Carl Johan Schönherr in 1823 in column 1140. It belongs to the subfamily Entiminae, tribe Eustylini.

It belongs to the so-called "Compsus genus complex". It has been proposed that Oxyderces is a synonym of Compsus.

Description 
In 1922 Sir Guy A. K. Marshall described the genus Plococompsus, which is currently a synonym of Oxyderces. This reference presents a good diagnosis for the genus:

Distribution 
Oxyderces is known from Argentina, Bolivia, Brazil, Colombia, Ecuador, Paraguay, Peru, Venezuela; Guadeloupe, Martinique.

Species list 
The following species have been assigned to this genus:

 Oxyderces argentinicus (Heller, 1921: 28): Argentina.
 Oxyderces bimaculatus (Hustache, 1923: 290): Argentina, Bolivia.
 Oxyderces cinereus (Hustache, 1938: 110): Ecuador. 
 Oxyderces cretaceus (Fabricius, 1792: 452): Guadeloupe, Martinique. 
 Oxyderces croesus (Faust, 1892: 11): Venezuela. 
 Oxyderces dubius (Voss, 1932: 40): Paraguay. 
 Oxyderces euchloris (Pascoe, 1880): Peru.
 Oxyderces exaratus (Hustache, 1938: 111): Colombia. 
 Oxyderces mansuetus Hustache, 1938: 109: Argentina. 
 Oxyderces mirandus (Pascoe, 1880: 423): Colombia, Ecuador. [synonyms: Oxyderces cicatricosus (Hustache, 1938), Oxyderces nigroundulatus (Hustache, 1938), Oxyderces texatus (Hustache, 1938) ]
 Oxyderces sinuatocostatus (Hustache, 1938: 112): Brazil. 
 Oxyderces tarapotae (Hustache, 1938: 113): Peru. 
 Oxyderces viridiaeris (Hustache, 1938: 115): Colombia. 
 Oxyderces viridipes (Boheman, 1840): Colombia.

References 

Entiminae
Weevil genera
Neotropical realm fauna